Molave, officially known as the Municipality of Molave (Subanen: Benwa Molave; Chavacano: Municipalidad de Molave), is a 1st class municipality in the province of Zamboanga del Sur, Philippines. In the 2020 census, it had 53,140 people. The name "Molave" refers to the tree (and its hardwood) that was common in the area. Corn, coconut, cassava, banana, camote and various vegetables are also grown. These are marketed to neighboring towns and cities, and reach Cebu. Due to its strategic location, Molave is becoming the commercial hub of the Salug Valley. It is the most populous municipality in Zamboanga del Sur, and the third most populous in Region IX.

Molave originated during the 1930s as a small settlement in a marshy jungle, originally known as Salug. The Subanons were early settlers of the area; the fertile land of the Salug Valley later attracted settlers from throughout the Philippines, making the area ethnically diverse. On June 16, 1948, the settlement was separated from the municipality of Aurora as a separate municipality and designated the new capital of the province of Zamboanga. Molave was the provincial capital until Zamboanga was divided into the provinces of Zamboanga del Norte and Zamboanga del Sur; it became part of Zamboanga del Sur, with the town of Pagadian as its capital.

History
The Subanon people were early inhabitants of the area. Molave originated during the early 1930s as a small settlement in a marshy jungle which was known originally as Salug. The fertile soil of the Salug Valley attracted settlers from Luzon, Visayas and Mindanao, making the area's population a diverse mix of Cebuano, Boholano, Ilongo, Tagalog, Ilocano, Leyteño, Misamisnon, Surigaonon, and Muslim and other ethnic groups. A number of Chinese and Filipino businessmen settled in the region before World War II.

The population influx enabled the settlement's rapid development. Molave became a municipality with Republic Act No. 286, authored by Representative  Juan S. Alano, on June 16, 1948. It was separated from the municipality of Aurora, established as a separate municipality, and was designated the capital of the then undivided province of Zamboanga with the act. Molave was the provincial capital until Zamboanga's division in 1952 into the provinces of Zamboanga del Norte and Zamboanga del Sur. It became part of Zamboanga del Sur, with Pagadian as its capital.

Pelagio Blancia was appointed Molave's first mayor. Blancia was defeated in the 1951 elections, and Mayor Javier Ariosa moved the seat of government from Camp 7 (present-day Barangay Blancia) to its present site. On December 31, 1987, former officer-in-charge Jose Geromo was running for mayor when he was assassinated by four New People's Army rebels while he was holding a political rally in Barangay Genosan. Ireneo Glepa, the current mayor, was Molave's youngest and longest-serving vice mayor. Unopposed for two terms as vice-mayor, Glepa was elected mayor in May 2010.

Geography

Molave is in the northeastern part of the province of Zamboanga del Sur, at the foot of a hill, and is bounded by the Salug River and mountains which protect it from typhoons. It is bordered by the municipalities of Tambulig in the east, Mahayag in the west, Josefina and Province of Zamboanga del Norte in the north, and Ramon Magsaysay in the south.

Topography
Molave is divided into two topographical areas. The east and southwest lowlands, which cover 30 percent of its total land area, consist of nine barangays and are generally flat, swampy and marshy. The upland, which covers 70 percent of Molave's total area, is hilly and mostly deforested. The terrain is moderately sloping to rolling, with the overall grade varying from 10 percent in the lowlands to 27 percent in the mountains.

The municipality has two types of soil. The lowlands and part of the upper barangays are composed of San Miguel silt loam, and is well-suited for cultivation. Adtoyon clay loam is found in the upland areas, and can be used for grazing and a variety of crops such as corn, cassava, and camote.

Climate

Molave is the fourth type on the PAGASA climatology map, with rainfall evenly distributed throughout the year.

Barangays
Molave is divided into 25 barangays:

Demographics

Economy

 Gross sales of registered companies: 
 Total capitalization of new businesses, 2015: ₱150,000,000
 Growth of capitalization of new businesses, 2014–2015: 286.9 percent

Molave is the commercial hub of the Salug Valley. Rice trading, milling and farming are major agricultural industries, and glass and aluminum are major non-agricultural industries. Corn, coconut, cassava, bananas, camote, and other vegetables are also grown. They are marketed to neighboring towns and cities as far as Cebu. Molave has 23 farmer cooperatives (19 of which are registered), with a total membership of 7,566.

Healthcare
Molave has ten barangay health stations, one maternity clinic, 26 health and nutrition posts, and a municipal health center staffed by one rural-health physician, one dentist, one sanitary inspector, three nurses and 11 midwives. It has three private hospitals (Lumapas Hospital, Salug Valley Medical Center and Blancia Hospital), five private clinics, ten pharmacies, and two funeral chapels, the oldest being the Valley of Angels Memorial Chapels establish in 1967.

Sports
Sports facilities include a municipal gymnasium, three tennis courts, four basketball courts, three volleyball courts and the Molave Regional Pilot School sports complex. A landscaped municipal plaza has a playground. A driving range is in the barangay of Parasan,  from Molave.

Law enforcement
The Molave Municipal Police station has two PCOs and 24 PNCOs. It has two outposts, in the Dipolo and Sudlon barangays. Crime has decreased in recent years, and the 10th Infantry Battalion of the 1st Infantry Division (stationed in Barangay Bag-ong Argao) and the 906th Provincial Mobile Group help to maintain order.

Education
Molave has four private preschools, 23 public and one private elementary school, six primary schools, five secondary schools and four tertiary schools. The secondary schools are:
 Blancia Carreon College Foundation, Inc. (High School Department)
 Molave Vocational Technical School (MVTS)
 Parasan National High School
 Sacred Heart Diocesan School
 Simata National High School

The tertiary schools are:
 J.H. Cerilles State College, Molave Campus
 Our Lady Of Triumph Institute of Technology, Molave 
 Western Mindanao State University - External Studies Unit, Molave
 Zamboanga del Sur Maritime Institute of Technology

References

External links
 
 Molave Profile at PhilAtlas.com
 [ Philippine Standard Geographic Code]
 Philippine census information

Municipalities of Zamboanga del Sur